Heinrich Emil Albert Knoevenagel (18 June 1865 – 11 August 1921) was the German chemist who established the Knoevenagel condensation reaction. The Knoevenagel condensation reaction of benzaldehydes with nitroalkanes is a classic general method for the preparation of nitroalkenes, which are very valuable synthetic intermediates.

Works
 
 Praktikum des anorganischen Chemikers : Einführung in die anorganische Chemie auf experimenteller Grundlage . Veit, Leipzig 2nd ed. 1909 Digital edition by the University and State Library Düsseldorf

External links
 Reaction description (in German)

References

1865 births
1921 deaths
20th-century German chemists
Academic staff of Heidelberg University
Scientists from Hanover
19th-century German chemists